Bahonsuai is an Austronesian language of Central Sulawesi, Indonesia.

References

Further reading
Mead, David. 1998. Proto-Bungku-Tolaki: Reconstruction of its phonology and aspects of its morphosyntax. PhD dissertation. Houston: Rice University. 
Mead, David. 1999. The Bungku–Tolaki languages of south-eastern Sulawesi, Indonesia. Series D-91. Canberra: Pacific Linguistics.  

Bungku–Tolaki languages
Languages of Sulawesi